There are 236 Grade II* listed buildings in Greater Manchester, England. In the United Kingdom, the term listed building refers to a building or other structure officially designated as being of special architectural, historical or cultural significance; Grade II* structures are those considered to be "particularly significant buildings of more than local interest". In England, the authority for listing under the Planning (Listed Buildings and Conservation Areas) Act 1990 rests with English Heritage, a non-departmental public body sponsored by the Department for Culture, Media and Sport.

The metropolitan county of Greater Manchester is made up of 10 metropolitan boroughs: Bolton, Bury, Manchester, Oldham, Rochdale, Salford, Stockport, Tameside, Trafford and Wigan. The Grade II* buildings in each borough are listed separately. Manchester, the world's first industrialised city, has 77 of Greater Manchester's 238 Grade II* listed buildings, the highest number of any borough. Bury has the least, with only eight. The River Irwell forms the boundary between Salford and Trafford, so one listed structure, Barton Swing Aqueduct, has been listed under both Salford and Trafford.

Most of Greater Manchester's listed buildings date from the Victorian and Edwardian periods. According to an Association for Industrial Archaeology publication, Greater Manchester is "one of the classic areas of industrial and urban growth in Britain, the result of a combination of forces that came together in the 18th and 19th centuries: a phenomenal rise in population, the appearance of the specialist industrial town, a transport revolution, and weak local lordship". Much of the region, historically a part of Lancashire, was at the forefront of textile manufacturing from the early 19th century until the early 20th century, and the county includes several former mill towns. Greater Manchester has a wealth of industrial heritage, represented by industrial architecture found throughout the county, but many of its Grade II* listed buildings have a municipal, ecclesiastic or other cultural heritage.

It is uncertain which Grade II* listed structure in Greater Manchester is the oldest. However, three of the 238 buildings date from the 13th century, making them the oldest. Brandlesholme Old Hall in Bury was once an open-hall cruck-framed house, originating in the 13th century, although altered and extended in the 16th century and completely remodelled in 1849. The Church of St Chad in Rochdale has a 13th-century tower (with an 1870 extension). And Mab's Cross in Wigan, the stump of a boundary cross, is probably 13th century in origin. The newest Grade II* listed building in Greater Manchester is the Daily Express Building, designed by Sir Owen Williams in 1939. Due to the heavy impact of the Industrial Revolution on Greater Manchester, just under half of its Grade II* listed buildings (112, 47%) were completed in the 19th century.

Bolton

|}

Bury

|}

Manchester

|}

Oldham

|}

Rochdale

|}

Salford

|}

Stockport

|}

Tameside

|}

Trafford

|}

Wigan

|}

See also 

Architecture of Manchester
Conservation in the United Kingdom
Grade I listed buildings in Greater Manchester
Grade II listed buildings in Manchester
List of tallest buildings in Manchester
Scheduled Monuments in Greater Manchester

Notes

References

External links 
 

 

Greater Manchester
Lists of listed buildings in Greater Manchester